William McKinley was a U.S. Representative from Virginia.

Biography
Born in Virginia, McKinley completed preparatory studies.  He served as member of the Virginia House of Delegates from Ohio County, Virginia (now part of West Virginia) from 1798 to 1804, 1806, and 1807.

McKinley was elected as a Democratic-Republican to the Eleventh Congress to fill the vacancy caused by the resignation of United States Representative John G. Jackson and served from December 21, 1810 to March 3, 1811.

He later served again as member of the Virginia House of Delegates, 1820, 1821, and 1824–1826.

Sources

Members of the Virginia House of Delegates
Year of birth missing
Year of death missing
People from Ohio County, West Virginia
Democratic-Republican Party members of the United States House of Representatives from Virginia